Boundary Cone is a geologic promontory located in the western foothills of the  Black Mountains in Mohave County, Arizona. The peak is to the east of the Mohave Valley, northeast of Needles, California, and southeast of Bullhead City.

History
Several Indian tribes attach religious and cultural significance to Boundary Cone as well as much of the surrounding landscape. In March 2006, the Bureau of Land Management determined and the Arizona State Historic Preservation Office concurred that Boundary Cone is eligible for inclusion on the National Register of Historic Places as a property of traditional, religious, and cultural importance to several Indian tribes.

Boundary Cone was a prominent landmark for early travelers in this region.

References

Volcanic plugs of Arizona
Mountains of Arizona
Religious places of the indigenous peoples of North America
Landforms of Mohave County, Arizona
Mountains of Mohave County, Arizona